Eileen M. Folson (born Eileen M. Garden, 1956 – February 4, 2007) was a Broadway composer, professional cellist, and a Grammy nominee.

Early life and education
Folson was born in 1956 as the fourth of six children. She began playing piano at around age 5 and took up her brother's trumpet after he quit, with an interest in becoming a jazz bassoonist.

Although the cello eventually became her major instrument, she was able to play several other instruments.  At the Philadelphia High School for Girls, she learned how to play harp, bassoon, cello, piano, and trumpet. She chose to focus on the cello, although she continued to play the trumpet in the bands that she played in with brothers Earl and Mark. Folson then attended the Settlement Music School in Philadelphia on scholarship, followed by University of Michigan in Ann Arbor, Michigan where she earned both her Bachelor of Music and her Master of Music in cello performance.

Professional career 
Folson's professional career began when she was chosen to apprentice with the New York Philharmonic Orchestra under the baton of Zubin Mehta. She first appeared as a student soloist with the Philadelphia Orchestra at the age of 17.
Her professional accomplishments include:
 New York Philharmonic Orchestra Fellow
 Broadway musician (including Phantom of the Opera, Into the Woods, Ragtime, The Lion King and Side Show)
 Grammy-nominated composer (J.J'S Jam from the album USQ Just Wait a Minute!)
 Studio musician (including Mary J. Blige, Lauryn Hill, Alicia Keys and Mýa) 
 Orchestral musician (Alicia Keys, Gladys Knight, Max Roach and the Double Quartet, The Uptown String Quartet, The Black Swan String Quartet)
 Television appearances (The Bill Cosby Show; Mr. Roger's Neighborhood)
 Touring musician (Luther Vandross)

Personal life 

Eileen Folsom was married for 28 years to Jack Folson; they had two children. She attended the First Baptist Church of Hillside. She died on February 4, 2007.

References 

1956 births
2007 deaths
American classical cellists
University of Michigan School of Music, Theatre & Dance alumni
20th-century American musicians
20th-century classical musicians
Philadelphia High School for Girls alumni
American women classical cellists
20th-century American women musicians
21st-century American women
20th-century cellists